Meredith Michaels-Beerbaum (born 26 December 1969) is an American-born German equestrian who competes at the international level in show jumping.

Career 
She grew up riding ponies and had a successful career as a Young Rider, both in equitation and in show jumping. As a young-adult, Michaels-Beerbaum studied political science at Princeton University, continuing to compete during her college years.
She then went to train in Germany with Paul Schockemöhle in 1991, planning to remain only for a summer, which eventually turned into a permanent stay. She decided to buy the training center in Balve.

Personal life 
She was born in Los Angeles, California, and is the daughter of film director Richard Michaels and actor Kristina Hansen.

Following her marriage to  the well-known German show jumper Markus Beerbaum in 1998, she changed her citizenship.
Together the Beerbaums have one daughter, Brianne Victoria Beerbaum, born in 2010. Through her marriage, Michaels-Beerbaum is also sister-in-law to Ludger Beerbaum, who has won multiple Olympic and championship medals in show jumping.

Horses

Current
 Unbelievable (born 2001), Dutch Warmblood,  Dark bay gelding, sired by Manhattan, damsire Democraat
 Fibonacci (born 2005), Swedish Warmblood, Grey gelding, sired by For Feeling, damsire Corland
 Atlanta (born 2005), Dutch Warmblood, Chestnut mare, sired by For Pleasure, damsire Achill-Libero H
 Comanche (born 2006), Oldenburg, Grey gelding, sired by Coupe de Coeur, damsire Baloubet du Rouet

Previous
 Bella Donna (born 2003), Holsteiner horse, Dark bay mare, sired by Baldini II, damsire Calido I
 Quick Star (1982–2011), Selle Français, Dark bay stallion, sired by Galoubet A, damsire Stella v. Nithard
 Shutterfly (born 1993), Hanoverian horse, Darkbay gelding, sired by Silvio I, damsire Forrest xx
 Kismet (Benedicte) (born 2001), Belgian Warmblood, Liver chestnut mare, sired by Kannan, damsire Furioso II
 Stella (born 1989), Dark bay mare, sired by Quick Star, damsire Wilson
 Le Mans (born 1995), Chestnut gelding, sired by Leubus, damsire Landadel
 Malou (born 2004), Grey mare, sired by Maloubet de Pleville, damsire Carthago
 Cantano (born 2000), Holsteiner horse, Bay stallion, sired by Cascavelle, damsire Acor
 Checkmate (born 1995), Hanoverian, Darkbay gelding, sired by Contender, damsire Pik Bube II

Achievements
 Gold medal team member, 9th individually, at the 1999 European Championships in Hickstead, England (Stella)
 5th place at the 2006 World Cup Final in Kuala Lumpur (Checkmate 4)
 Gold medal winner of the 2005 World Cup Final in Las Vegas, NV (Shutterfly)
 Silver medal at the 2004 World Cup Final in Milan, Italy (Shutterfly)
Nations Cup starts:27 Wins:8
 Ladies German Championships Gold Medal in 1999 and 2001, Silver medal in 2002, Bronze medal in 1998, 4th place in 2004
 German Championships Bronze Medal in 2004, 5th place in 2002
German Championship Winner in 2008 at Balve Optimum and 2010 at "Turnier der Sieger" in Münster
First woman to win the World Cup Finals three times (2005, 2008, 2009)
Ranked #1 in the Rolex World Rankings for 11 consecutive months in 2008 (February–December).
Bronze medal in Team Jumping event at the 2016 Summer Olympics (Fibonacci) in Rio de Janeiro

See also
List of Princeton University Olympians

References 
FEI Rider's Biography
http://www.michaels-beerbaum.de/20-Biographie.htm

External links 
 
 
 
 

1969 births
Living people
Sportspeople from Los Angeles
German show jumping riders
German female equestrians
American female equestrians
American expatriate sportspeople in Germany
Olympic equestrians of Germany
Equestrians at the 2008 Summer Olympics
Equestrians at the 2012 Summer Olympics
Equestrians at the 2016 Summer Olympics
Olympic bronze medalists for Germany
Olympic medalists in equestrian
Medalists at the 2016 Summer Olympics